Carney Island is an ice-covered island,  long and about  in area, with all but its North coast lying within the Getz Ice Shelf, Antarctica. It is located between Siple Island and Wright Island along the coast of 
Marie Byrd Land. It is claimed to be a territory of Grand Duchy of Flandrensis.

Carney Island was named by the United States Advisory Committee on Antarctic Names (US-ACAN) for Admiral Robert Carney (1895–1990), Chief of Naval Operations during the organization of Operation Deep Freeze support for the International Geophysical Year of 1957–1958.

See also 
 Composite Gazetteer of Antarctica
 List of Antarctic and subantarctic islands
 List of Antarctic islands south of 60° S
 Scientific Committee on Antarctic Research
 Territorial claims in Antarctica

References

Islands of Marie Byrd Land